CASA or casa may refer to:

 Casa (surname), surname

Music
 B.U.G. Mafia prezintă CASA, 2002 album by Romanian hip hop group B.U.G. Mafia
 Casa (Morelenbaum²/Sakamoto album), 2001
 Casa (Natalia y La Forquetina album), 2005, or the title song
 Casa, a 2018 album by Carolina Deslandes

Organizations
 CASA de Maryland, Latino and immigration advocacy-and-assistance organization
 Casa Pia A.C., Portuguese athletic club
 Canadian Alliance of Student Associations
 Capital Area School for the Arts, Pennsylvania, US
 Center for Adaptive Systems Applications, co-founded by Roger Jones
 Centro de Acción Social Autónomo, center for immigrant and Chicano workers in San Francisco
 Church's Auxiliary for Social Action, New Delhi, India
 Court Appointed Special Advocates, a US association supporting court-appointed advocates for abused or neglected children
 CASA or Initiative Factory, Liverpool, on the UK Social Centre Network
 The National Center on Addiction and Substance Abuse at Columbia University, CASAColumbia, US
 Centre for Advanced Spatial Analysis, University College London, England
 Engineering Research Center for Collaborative Adaptive Sensing of the Atmosphere
 Contemporary A Cappella Society, a charitable organization dedicated to fostering and promoting a cappella music

Aviation
 EADS CASA, a Spanish aircraft manufacturer merged with Airbus Military in 2009
 Construcciones Aeronáuticas SA (CASA), EADS CASA's predecessor
 Civil Aviation Safety Authority, the statutory authority responsible for the regulation of civil aviation in Australia

Places
 Casa, Arkansas, United States
 Casablanca, Morocco, nicknamed "Casa"
 Casa de Tableta, historic place in Portola Valley, California

Science and technology
 AIPS++/CASA (Common Astronomy Software Applications), image-processing software
 Cas A or Cassiopeia A, bright supernova remnant
 Chaperone-assisted selective autophagy, in biochemistry
 Chicago Air Shower Array, former high-energy astronomy facility
 Computational auditory scene analysis, machine listening
 Computer assisted semen analysis
 Computers are social actors, paradigm in psychology

Other uses
 Casa Condominio Residenza or The CASA, in Toronto, Canada
 Casa particular, "private house" or simply casa, accommodation in Cuba
 Casa (TV channel), a Canadian television channel
 CASA ratio (current and saving accounts)
 Casa 74, a condominium building in Upper East Side, Manhattan, New York City, US

See also
 Kasa (disambiguation)
 Casa de Uceda, Spain
 Casa da Moeda do Brasil, mint, Brazil
 Casa de Contratación, Spanish Empire agency
 Casa de la Moneda (disambiguation), "house of money", the Spanish term for mint, and the name of institutions in many countries
 Casa de las Américas, Cuba
 Casa Diablo (disambiguation)
 Casa Grande (disambiguation)
 Casa Nova, Bahia, Brazil
 Casa del Quart d’Anyós, Andorra
 Casa Verde (district of São Paulo), Brazil
 Casa Rosada (pink house), Argentine presidential building